Still Life With Eggplant is an album by Motorpsycho, released on April 12, 2013 via Stickman Records and Rune Grammofon. The title is the same as one painting of Henri Matisse and one fictional painting appearing in the third episode of the third season of the television series Jeeves and Wooster.

Track listing
 Hell, Part 1-3 (Kapstad/Ryan/Sæther) – 9:47
 August (Lee) – 4:52
 Barleycorn (Let It Come/Let It Be) (Sæther) – 7:18
 Ratcatcher (Kapstad/Ryan/Sæther) – 17:10
 The Afterglow (Ryan/Sæther) – 5:58

Personnel
Bent Sæther – vocals, bass, guitars, keyboards
Hans Magnus Ryan – vocals, guitars, keyboards
Kenneth Kapstad – drums

with:
Reine Fiske – electric & acoustic guitars on tracks 2-5, mellotron on track 5
Thomas Henriksen – keyboards on track 3

References

 Motorpsycho – Still Life With Eggplant - echoesanddust.com

2013 albums
Motorpsycho albums